The 1976 Soviet football championship was the 44th–45th seasons of competitive football in the Soviet Union, the 38th–39th among teams of masters. Dinamo Moscow won the Top League spring championship becoming the Soviet domestic champions for the eleventh and the last time, while Torpedo Moscow won the Top League fall championship becoming the Soviet domestic champions for the third and also the last time.

Honours

Notes = Number in parentheses is the times that club has won that honour. * indicates new record for competition

Soviet Union football championship

Top League

Spring

Autumn (Fall)

First League

Second League (playoffs)

 [Nov 1, 5]
 Guria Lanchkhuti     0-0 0-2  URALMASH Sverdlovsk 
 Meliorator Yangiyer  1-1 2-3  DINAMO Leningrad 
 Mashuk Pyatigorsk    1-0 0-2  Krivbass Krivoi Rog

Replay 
 [Nov 11]
 KRIVBASS Krivoi Rog  3-0 Mashuk Pyatigorsk [in Simferopol]

Top goalscorers

Top League
 (spring) Arkadiy Andriasyan (Ararat Yerevan) – 8 goals
 (autumn) Aleksandr Markin (Zenit Leningrad) – 13 goals

First League
Elbrus Abbasov (Neftchi Baku) – 28 goals

References

External links
 1976 Soviet football championship. RSSSF